The Labour Party Conference is the annual conference of the British Labour Party. It is formally the supreme decision-making body of the party and is traditionally held in the final week of September, during the party conference season when the House of Commons is in recess, after each year's second Liberal Democrat Conference and before the Conservative Party Conference. The Labour Party Conference opens on a Sunday and finishes the following Wednesday, with an address by the Deputy Leader of the Labour Party; the Leader's address is usually on the Tuesday. In contrast to the Liberal Democrat Conference, where every party member attending its Conference, either in-person or online, has the right to vote on party policy, under a one member, one vote system, or the Conservative Party Conference, which does not hold votes on party policy, at the Labour Party Conference, 50% of votes are allocated to affiliated organisations (such as trade unions), and the other 50% to Constituency Labour Parties, but all voting in both categories is restricted to nominated representatives (known as delegates).

Conference

Delegates
Delegates to the conference are elected by Constituency Labour Parties, affiliated trade unions and socialist societies. Currently, affiliated trade unions hold 50% of the votes at the conference, down from 80% in the era before Tony Blair. Some 40% of the votes are wielded by the three largest trade unions (Unite, GMB, Unison).

Resolutions
Resolutions for debate are put forward by CLPs and unions before the conference begins. In recent years, party members have had less say in what is debated at the annual conference, as the party leadership has tried to move policy-making increasingly into the new National Policy Forums, which meet in private.

Role of the NEC
The National Executive Committee leads the conference (although the details of the conference, including what is debated, are managed by the Conference Arrangements Committee) and if it does not agree with a resolution, the committee may put pressure on the backers to withdraw or remit it. Remittance means that the resolution's backers agree to "send back" the resolution to the National Executive so that it can consider the matter in more detail; this is viewed by some as a mere delaying tactic. The resolutions voted upon are normally composites, meaning that they have been compiled by combining several resolutions put forward by different bodies into a single wording agreed beforehand.

List of 1900s conferences

Of the Labour Representation Committee

Of the Labour Party

From 2000

Tony Blair leadership

2000 Brighton
The international guest speaker was Nelson Mandela, the former President of South Africa.

2001 Brighton
The international guest speaker was Gerhard Schröder, the Chancellor of Germany.

2002 Blackpool
The international guest speaker was Bill Clinton, former President of the United States of America.

2003 Bournemouth
The international guest speaker to address conference was Hamid Karzai, the first President of the Islamic Republic of Afghanistan.

2004 Brighton
The 2004 party conference was held in Brighton during the final week of September. Conference rejected a call for withdrawal from Iraq, but accepted a resolution calling for renationalisation of the railways; the leadership declared that it would ignore this. The conference was addressed by the Irish rock star Bono who called for more action to combat the spread of AIDS and the debt problems African countries.

Conference closed with the singing of The Red Flag and Jerusalem.

2005 Brighton
Over 600 people were held under the recent terrorism acts, including Walter Wolfgang an 82-year-old peace activist and onetime teenaged refugee from Nazi Germany who was arrested for attempting to re-enter the conference without a pass. None were subsequently charged.

2006 Manchester
In 2006 the conference was held in Manchester at the G-Mex and Manchester International Conference Centre from 24 to 28 September. It was the first time since 1974 that the main Labour conference was not held at a seaside town and the first time since 1917 the Labour conference had been held in Manchester. This followed Labour's Spring 2004 conference which was held at the G-Mex for the first time. The conference was Blair's last as leader after he stated this would be the case just before the conference and at the conference itself. The start of the conference was marked with protests against the Iraq War.

Tony Blair, in his last speech to conference as Labour Party leader and Prime Minister, praised the work of the Chancellor of the Exchequer, Gordon Brown.

The conference was addressed in a joint session by Labour's Mayor of London, Ken Livingstone and the Mayor of Los Angeles Antonio Villaraigosa on the subject of climate change. Bob Geldof and Monica Naggaga from Oxfam (Uganda) spoke together about the plight of Africa. The main international guest speaker was the former US President Bill Clinton. Another international visitor – but not a speaker to the conference – was Shimon Peres, the former Prime Minister of Israel.

St Johns C.E. Primary School's steel band also performed there before Tony Blair came on stage.

Gordon Brown leadership

2007 Bournemouth
The 2007 conference was held in the Bournemouth International Centre from 23 to 27 September. The conference was the first with Gordon Brown as leader of the Labour Party and Prime Minister, and he laid out his plans for his premiership. It was a first conference for Harriet Harman as Deputy Leader.

2008 Manchester
The 2008 conference was held between 20 and 24 September in Manchester at Manchester Central (formerly G-Mex). The opening day of conference was moved from Sunday to Saturday to allow people who work during the week to attend. The Labour leader and Prime Minister, Gordon Brown, delivered his keynote address on 23 September.

2009 Brighton
The 2009 conference was held in Brighton from 27 September to 1 October 2009. It saw an impassioned address from Peter Mandelson, given on 28 September, in which he claimed that Labour was in "the fight of our lives" as the forthcoming general election approached. Gordon Brown gave his keynote address to the conference on the afternoon of 29 September, saying that Labour was "not done yet". Shortly afterwards Britain's biggest selling newspaper, The Sun announced that it would withdraw its support for the Labour Party and gave its backing to the Conservatives. Union leader and Labour supporter Tony Woodley responded to this by tearing up a copy of that edition of The Sun, telling the audience: "In Liverpool, we learnt a long time ago what to do. I suggest the rest of the country should do exactly the same thing"; in reference to the hostility felt in Liverpool towards The Sun newspaper following its controversial allegations about the behaviour of Liverpool FC supporters during the Hillsborough disaster 20 years earlier. In the Prime Ministers Keynote Address Gordon Brown listed no fewer than twenty Labour Party achievements since 1997 and received an early standing ovation. The address would be his last as Prime Minister and for the Party would be their thirteenth and last party conference in government.

Ed Miliband leadership

2010 Manchester

Shortly after losing the 2010 general election to the Conservatives, following a Liberal Democrat coalition, the 2010 Conference took place between 26 and 30 September 2010 at Manchester Central Conference Centre. The conference started with the announcement of the results of the 2010 leadership election and was Ed Miliband's first conference as leader. In his first major speech as leader on 28 September, Miliband told delegates that his "new generation" would return the party to power. The following day David Miliband announced he would not be serving in his brother's shadow cabinet, although he would continue as an MP. Other highlights of the conference included activists condemning the coalition government's proposed public spending cuts as "obscene" on 27 September, and a close of conference address from Harriet Harman in which she told delegates that Ed Miliband would "fortify" the party.

2011 Liverpool
The 2011 Conference took place in Liverpool from 25 to 29 September. It was the first time since 1925 that Labour had held its Annual Conference there. On 26 September delegates voted to scrap the tradition of Shadow Cabinet elections. Ed Miliband's keynote speech on 27 September suffered a five-minute blackout after all media communications were lost.

2012 Manchester 
The 2012 Conference was held in Manchester from 30 September – 4 October at Manchester Central Conference Centre. Labour Leader Ed Miliband's speech was the first by a Labour leader in around twenty years to be delivered without the use of an Autocue, enabling him to walk up and down the stage during his speech while maintaining eye contact with his audience, replicating the style of David Cameron in 2005 when running for leadership of the Conservative Party.

2013 Brighton
The 2013 Conference took place in Brighton from 22 to 25 September at the Brighton Centre.

2014 London (Special Conference)
A special conference was held at ExCeL London on 1 March to approve rule changes arising from former general-secretary Ray Collins review of party reform. The changes included replacing the electoral college system for selecting new leaders with a "one member, one vote" system. Mass membership would be encouraged by allowing "registered supporters" to join at a low cost, as well as full membership. Members from the trade unions would also have to explicitly "opt in" rather than "opt out" of paying a political levy to Labour.

2014 Manchester
The 2014 Conference was held in Manchester from 21 to 24 September at Manchester Central Conference Centre. Ed Miliband was criticised by his own colleagues for failing to mention the deficit and immigration in his Conference address, despite having promised to do so in his pre-speech press release. It was Miliband's last Autumn Conference address as Labour Leader.

Jeremy Corbyn leadership

2015 Brighton
The results of the leadership and deputy leadership elections were announced prior to the Annual Conference on 12 September at a special conference.
The 2015 conference took place in Brighton between 27 September and 30 September. The new Labour Leader, Jeremy Corbyn, reinstated the use of the Autocue, three years after it had been abandoned by Ed Miliband. It was the first time that Corbyn had used one to deliver a speech.

2016 Liverpool

The 2016 Conference took place at ACC Liverpool; it started on 25 September and ran until Wednesday 28 September. The result of the 2016 leadership election was announced the previous day, with Jeremy Corbyn being re-elected. The conference heard impassioned pleas from Deputy Leader Tom Watson and Mayor of London Sadiq Khan for unity and a need for the party to gain power. Because of the second leadership election in two years and the divisive ideological discussions, there was concern about a fraught atmosphere at the conference. However, delegates and elected representatives came together in harmony on many issues, including opposition to plans for grammar school expansions, a 'hard Brexit' and on accepting more unaccompanied child refugees into Britain. Part of Corbyn's platform for the second leadership election was accepting the result of the EU referendum that year, though there were motions and debates on Europe and the prospect of a second referendum. The first year of The World Transformed, a festival hosted by the left-wing grassroots campaigning group Momentum, took place in the city at the same time as the conference.

2017 Brighton

The 2017 Conference took place at the Brighton Centre in Brighton and had 13,000 attendees from Sunday 24 September to Wednesday 27 September 2017. The conference atmosphere was regarded as positive, following the relative successes of the party at the 2017 general election. The Labour deputy leader, Tom Watson, announced a number of policy plans, including: Forcing gambling companies to pay a levy to fund research and NHS treatment to help problem gamblers deal with their addiction, and; Banning football clubs from signing shirt sponsorship deals with betting companies The conference cut the amount of politicians from the program in order to let more regular party members to have slots. One example that received media attention was a passionate speech delivered by Lauren Stocks, a 16-year-old schoolgirl from Greater Manchester, that subsequently went viral. Commentator quickly drew parallels with William Hague's 1977 Conservative conference, which he delivered when he was also 16. Stocks spoke about the toll that changes to the exams had taken on her and her classmates and argued that:There's a statistic we were shown when I was about 13 or 14 that told me 3 in 10 people in every classroom suffer with a mental illness. Now I'm going to be a bit frank here conference. That is bollocks! It's a good half ... I could've walked into any food tech, history, art, maths classroom and just watched seas of spaced-out, stressed-out, depressed kids, in a battlefield where they can't afford pens and paper! ... It is a disgusting sight and we cannot sit on our hands any longer!

Jeremy Corbyn's leadership speech lasted 75 minutes and included a number of well received jokes, which came at the expense of both the Conservative party - specifically their reference to being unable to find a 'magic money tree', to fund new initiatives, prior to 2017 general election, only to find £1 billion to serve as the basis of a confidence and supply deal with the DUP following the Conservative Party's re-election with a reduced majority - and the Daily Mail. In terms of policy, Corbyn pledged that a Labour government would give cities the power to bring in rent controls and introduce restrictions on gentrification projects, citing the then recent Grenfell Tower fire.

Hundreds of fringe events took place at the conference, including:
 The second year of The World Transformed a festival hosted by Momentum was hosted in the city. At the festival, former Labour party leader Ed Miliband hosting a political pub quiz, focusing on Labour history and current affairs.
 Centre for Cities, a think tank focused on cities in the UK, hosted a "the future of urban leadership" event. Chaired by Andrew Carter and with a panel consisting of: Andy Burnham (Greater Manchester Mayor), Steve Rotheram (Metro Mayor of the Liverpool City Region), Michelle Dix (Managing Director of Crossrail 2), Francesca Gains (Head of Politics at University of Manchester) and David Orr (Chief Executive of the National Housing Federation).

2018 Liverpool
The 2018 Conference took place at the Arena and Convention Centre Liverpool (ACC Liverpool) from 23 to 26 September, with a capacity of 13,000 delegates at the event. It was announced at the party that private property tenants would be given more protections, as landlords couldn't evict them without reason. John McDonnell announced that workers in companies with more than 250 employees would become joint share holders in a structure that the law would oblige to adopt, with each employee receiving a payout at the end of each year. Angela Rayner announced a range of education reforms: that Labour would scrap the Free School program, democratise Academy schools, give local authorities the power to take control of badly performing Academies and remove the ability to shape their own admission policies.

The prospect of a second referendum on the UK's relationship with the European Union was a heavily discussed topic at the conference. Both Leader Jeremy Corbyn and Deputy Leader Tom Watson had said should the conference vote for a second referendum they would support it. The motion was discussed by delegates on the Sunday, including MPs and representatives from People's Vote and other delegates, and after five hours they had written a two-paged motion stating that "If we cannot get a general election Labour must support all options remaining on the table, including campaigning for a public vote". The vote on motion took place on the Tuesday.

Party delegates voted on the Member of Parliament reselection process. They lowered the threshold required of local branches and local union branches to express dissatisfaction in an MP's performance from 50% to 33%.

Fringe Events also took place at the conference:
 The World Transformed: A four-day festival of music and politics organised by Momentum with the capacity for 10,000 people to attend. Speakers include 2017 French presidential candidate Jean-Luc Mélenchon as a key-note speaker, as well as Jeremy Corbyn, Katja Kipping (leader of Die Linke), Ralf Stegner (SPD), Zitto Kabwe (leader of Alliance for Change and Transparency) and Ash Sarkar.
 Councils against Austerity: A group of 24 Labour council leaders and 12 local Labour group leaders, who signed an open letter sent to Prime Minister Theresa May criticising austerity's effect on Local Government, organised an event at the conference.
 Real Britain: an event hosted by The Mirror it was chaired by journalist Kevin Maguire and had speakers such as John McDonnell, Len McCluskey and former footballer Neville Southall. At this event McCluskey stated Unite's interest in supporting Labour Party candidates in Northern Ireland, instead of the SDLP.

2019 Brighton

The 2019 Conference took place at the Brighton Centre from 21 to 25 September. Earlier in the year, there was talk of hosting a special conference on a resolution to the deadlock on whether Labour should back a second referendum on Britain's relationship with the European Union. However, in July 2019  Labour's affiliated trade unions agreed a joint position on Brexit, in which any finalised Brexit deal would be subject to a referendum, with the party to back a Remain vote if a Conservative government had negotiated the deal, and the party’s position to be decided if it was a Labour government's deal. Conference delegates voted on whether Labour should fully support remain in a second referendum, or support the leadership's position of hosting a special conference after securing a majority government of how to campaign in the referendum. A majority of delegates supported the leaderships position.

Conference delegates voted on and supported several policy motions, including: supporting a Green New Deal - which included large investments in windfarms and making the country carbon neutral by 2030, reducing working hours to 32-hour week within a decade, abolish private schools, free prescriptions in England, the creation of a National Care Service (a care-focused counterpart to the National Health Service) and extension of voting rights to all residents of the UK regardless of their citizenship.

Jeremy Corbyn brought his speech forward by a day due to the Supreme Court ruling that the prorogation of Parliament by Prime Minister Boris Johnson was unlawful.

Keir Starmer leadership

2020 London (Special Conference)
On 4 April, a special conference was due to take place in London in order to announce the results of the leadership election, the deputy leadership election and by-elections for two membership election NEC positions and a BAME (Black And other Minority Ethnicities) place on the National Executive Committee. The conference was cancelled due to the Coronavirus pandemic Results were subsequently announced via the Labour Party social media feeds. Keir Starmer was announced as the 19th leader of the Labour Party.

2020 Connected (Online Conference)
The 2020 Labour Party Conference would have taken place in Liverpool from Saturday 19 September to Wednesday 23 September, however it was moved to an online format due to the COVID-19 outbreak. It was Keir Starmer's first conference as leader. Taking place from 19 to 22 September, the virtual conference was renamed Labour Connected and described by the party as focused on "people coming together, to create a fairer and better society" whilst including activities such as "keynotes, training, rallies, policy discussions, and an interactive virtual expo". The senior figures who spoke at the event included deputy leader Angela Rayner and shadow chancellor Anneliese Dodds. Keir Starmer's speech took place on the final day, during which he criticised the government's handling of COVID-19 in the UK commenting that "just when the country needs leadership, we get serial incompetence,". Starmer also focused on how Labour had changed since his election as party leader earlier that year, emphasising that the party was "under new leadership".

2021 Brighton 
The 2021 Labour Party conference took place between Saturday 25 September to Wednesday 29 September. It saw members attend in-person for the first time since the 2019 Conference.

Prior to the conference, motions were blocked by the Conference Arrangement Committee and party staff which were seen as too "broad". This included both the Labour for a 'Green Jobs Revolution' motion and the 'Build Back Fairer' motion, both backed by the party's left. Instead, less radical but similar motions were allowed to remain as motions. The decision was quickly reversed after an appeal.

Controversy emerged due to Keir Starmer wishing to change the voting system for Leadership elections at this conference. He proposed reverting from One member, one vote, in which each Labour party member and supporter has an equal vote back to the electoral college where MPs, the membership and trade unions have a third of the vote each. The plan was accused of being anti-democratic, inappropriately timed and lacking consultation. Media has speculated that this change in voting system was an attempt to continue a internal struggle with the left-wing of the party, and to stop another candidate like Jeremy Corbyn from winning the election. Prior to conference, the media reported opposition from Unite the Union, TSSA, CWU, Momentum and; uncertainty from Unison, GMB and Usdaw. Starmer gave up on the electoral college after it failed to gain the support of trade unions; however, the party's executive committee agreed to send a series of more modest reforms to conference, including increasing the percentage of Labour MPs a candidate would need the support of to get on the leadership election ballot, banning the party's newest members from voting, and making it harder for members to deselect MPs. These changes were later passed by a small margin.

See also
 Conservative Party Conference
 Liberal Democrat Conference
 Party conference season

References

External links

 Labour Party official website

Annual events in the United Kingdom
Conferences
Conferences in the United Kingdom
Organisation of the Labour Party (UK)
Political conferences
Political events
Political events in the United Kingdom
Political party assemblies
Recurring events established in 1907